Società Polisportiva Grottammare 1899 is an Italian association football club located in Grottammare, Marche. It currently plays in Promozione. Its colors are white and light blue.

External links
Grottamamare page at Serie-D.com

Football clubs in Italy
Association football clubs established in 1899
Football clubs in the Marche
1899 establishments in Italy